The state of Goiás is divided into 18 statistical microregions by the Instituto Brasileiro de Geografia e Estatístic (IBGE).  These have no administrative function but are used only for statistics.  The total area of the state is 341,289 km2 and the population is 5,450,303 as of 2007.  
Thirty seven percent of the population—2,032,305—lives in the Goiânia Microregion and 17.6%--960,141—of the population lives in the Entorno do Distrito Federal Microregion.  The GDP of the state of Goiás was R$50,536 billion in 2005, the last year data was gathered.

Microregions of Goiás

References

Sepin
IBGE